Schizoporaceae are a family of fungi in the order Hymenochaetales. These are saprobic, and cause white rots of standing and fallen wood of coniferous and broadleaved trees. According to one 2008 estimate, the family contains 14 genera and 109 species.

Genera
Alutaceodontia
Basidioradulum
Echinodia
Echinoporia
Fibrodontia
Lagarobasidium
Leucophellinus
Kneiffiella
Odontiopsis
Palifer
Paratrichaptum
Poriodontia
Rogersella
Schizopora
Xylodon

References

Hymenochaetales
Basidiomycota families